Ottermere is an unincorporated place and community in Unorganized Kenora District in northwestern Ontario, Canada.

Ottermere railway station is in the community. The station is on the Canadian National Railway transcontinental main line, between Malachi to the west and Wade to the east, and is served by Via Rail transcontinental Canadian trains.

References

Communities in Kenora District